Malaysian Indians or Indian Malaysians are Malaysian citizens of Indian or South Asian ancestry. Today, they form the third-largest group in Malaysia after the Malays and the Chinese. Most are descendants of those who migrated from India during the British Malaya era from the early 19th to mid-20th centuries.

The majority of Malaysian Indians are ethnic Tamils; smaller groups include the Malayalees, Telugus, Punjabis and others. Malaysian Indians form the fifth largest community of Overseas Indians in the world. Within Malaysia, they represent the third-largest group (constituting 6.8% of the Malaysian population), after the ethnic Malay and Chinese. They are usually simply referred to as "Indian" in Malaysia, Orang India in Malay, "Yin du ren" in Chinese.

Malaysia's Indian population is notable for its class stratification, with a significant elite as well as a large low income group within its fold. Malaysian Indians make up a disproportionately large percentage of professionals per capita – constituting 15.5% of Malaysia's professionals in 1999. As of a census taken in 1984, up to 38% of the nation's medical professional workforce consists of Malaysian Indians. In 1970, the per capita income of Malaysian Indians was 76% higher than that of the Malay majority, by 2005, this gap had reduced to 27%.

History

First Wave: Pre-colonial period

Ancient India exerted a profound influence over Southeast Asia through trade, religious missions, wars and other forms of contact. Pre-colonial Malaysia was part of 'Indianised Kingdoms' such as Srivijaya, Kadaram and the Majapahit, which formed part of a cultural region known as Greater India. There is a possibility that the first wave of migration from India towards Southeast Asia happened during Asoka's invasion towards Kalinga and Samudragupta's expedition towards the South.
 

The Arab and Indian traders had travelled this region including the southern tip of South East Asia the peninsula with maritime trade, the Sailendra kings of Java originating from Kalinga were able to take control of the Peninsular and part of southern Siam. The kings welcomed Buddhist missionaries from India, accepting their teaching of the Mahayana sect, which spread through their territories. However, central and northeastern Thailand continued to adhere to the Hinayana teachings of the Theravada sect, which had been introduced by missionaries sent by the emperor Ashoka in the 3rd century BC.
Another theory of the introduction of Buddhism after Indian arrived in the peninsula is that after Kalinga conquered lower Burma in the 8th century their influence gradually spread down the peninsula. The ancient Indian Kalinga was located in southeastern India occupying modern day Orissa and northern Andhra Pradesh. In the 7th century an Indonesian kingdom was named Kalingga after the aforementioned Kalinga in India. Chinese sources mention this kingdom (Holing) as a center for Buddhist scholars around 604 before it was overshadowed by the Sanjaya or Mataram Kingdom. The most famous Kalingga ruler is Ratu Sima.

There is evidence of the existence of Indianised kingdoms such as Gangga Negara, Old Kedah, Srivijaya since approximately 1700 years ago. Early contact between the kingdoms of Tamilakkam and the Malay peninsula had been very close during the reigns of the Pallava dynasty (from the 4th to the 9th century CE) and Chola dynasty (from the 9th to the 13th century CE). The trade relations the Tamil merchants had with the ports of Malaya led to the emergence of Indianised kingdoms like Kadaram (Old Kedah) and Langkasugam. Furthermore, Chola king Rajendra Chola I sent an expedition to Kadaram (Srivijaya) during the 11th century conquering that country on behalf of one of its rulers who sought his protection and to have established him on the throne. The Cholas had a powerful merchant and naval fleet in the Indian Ocean and the Bay of Bengal. Three kinds of craft are distinguished by the author of the Periplus – light coasting boats for local traffic, larger vessels of a more complicated structure and greater carrying capacity, and lastly the big ocean-going vessels that made the voyages to Malaya, Sumatra, and the Ganges. In Malacca Sultanate, the Chitty people, played a huge role in Malacca's administration of the local ports such as Raja Mudaliar, Syahbandar (Chief of Port) of Malacca and Bendahara Tun Mutahir, a famous Bendahara of the Malaccan Sultanate.

Second Wave: Colonial period

Following the Portuguese colonisation of Malacca (Malaysia) in 1511, the Portuguese government encouraged their explorers to bring their married Indian women who were converted already to Roman Catholic Christianity, under a policy set by Afonso de Albuquerque, then Viceroy of India. These people were Goan Catholics (Konkani Catholics) and East Indians (Catholics of Marathi descent). Kuparis who were of mixed Samvedic Brahmin, Goan and Portuguese descent also arrived. Their children already intermarried with Malay population, losing their ethnic identities. British acquisition of Penang, Melaka, and Singapore - the Straits Settlements from 1786 to 1824 started a steady inflow of Indian labour. This consisted of traders, policemen, plantation labourers and colonial soldiers (see sepoys). Apart from this there was also substantial migration of Indians to work in the British colonial government, due to their general good command of the English language.

The establishment of the plantations and the need for cheap labour led to an influx of Indian migrants working under the indenture Kangani system in the 19th and early 20th century. Some, after the Kangani system ended in the early 20th century, also paid for their own passage to Malaya. These migrant workers were primarily Tamils (around 80%), with some Telugus, Malayalis as well as Bengalis from eastern India and Punjabis from western India. The Tamils were primarily non-Brahmin middle-ranking or low-caste Hindus, including Gounder, Kallar, Muthuraja, Pallar, Vanniyar and Paraiyar, the Telugus include Kamma and Reddy, while the Malayali were mostly from the Nayar caste. These workers were distinct from the commercial and educated group of urban Indians, who were often high caste or high and middle class Tamils, Telugus, Malayali, Punjabis, and Bengalis. The Gujaratis, Sindhis and Marwaris arrived as "passenger Indians" much like in other British colonies. These urban Indians may be Hindus, Christians, Sikhs or Muslims. The Sikhs mainly worked in the police force, while other northern Indians were involved in business. The Malayalees, Ceylonese and Christian Tamils may be involved in government and private white-collar work, the Chettiar in money-lending or finance, while the Vellalar and Muslim Tamils may be in various kind of businesses.

The Indian population in pre-independence Malaya and Singapore was predominantly adult males who were single or with family back in India and Sri Lanka. Hence the population fluctuated frequently with periods of immigration to Malaya and periods of exodus of people back to India. As early as 1901 the Indian population in the Straits Settlements and the Federated Malay States was approximately 120,000. By 1931 there were 640,000 Indians in Malaya and Singapore and they even outnumbered the native Malays in the state of Selangor that year.

However, during World War II many Indian men and women left for Burma as part of the Indian National Army with thousands thought to have perished. As a result, the population of Indians in 1957 had only increased to 820,000. While immigration was a major factor for the increase in population until Independence, the population growth began falling after that as the white collar classes in the civil service and plantations left when British institutions and companies left the country. Since then, lower birth rates and emigration to countries like Singapore, Australia, UK, etc. in search of better educational and economic opportunities meant that Indians continue to see their share of Malaysia's population decline just as is the case with the Chinese. Today, Malaysian Indians account for approximately 7 per cent of the total population of Malaysia (approx. 2 million) and 9 per cent in Singapore (450,000).

Third Wave : Contemporary period
From the 1990s to the present period, there has also been a much smaller wave of Indian nationals into Singapore and Malaysia to work in the construction and engineering industry, restaurants, the IT sector, teaching and finance with many taking up permanent residence in Singapore where they account for nearly a quarter of the Singapore population. The unskilled labour mainly work in Indian restaurants. There are also foreign spouses from the Indian Subcontinent who are married to local Indians.

Demographics

7.0% of the Malaysian population are Indians as of 2016.

There is a close correspondence between the ethnic and occupational divisions of the Indian community, and this is inevitably reflected in the community's geographical distribution in Malaya. The South Indian Tamils were the majority throughout the country, on the rubber estates and railways, though a significant proportion found employment on the docks in Penang and Singapore.
Selangor is the state with the most number of Indians in terms of absolute number whereas Negeri Sembilan is the state with the highest proportion of Malaysian Indians making up the population.

 Non-citizens are excluded in figures and percentage
 Population estimates are rounded to the nearest hundred.

Education 
There are significant differences between Malaysian Indians who are part of the Malaysian working class in plantations and urban middle class or upper middle class professionals.
Many Indians are workers in plantations and attend Tamil language schools. Tamil language primary schools are funded by the Federal Government, but Tamil schools on private lands are not eligible for full government grant. Although Tamil is used as the medium of instruction, Malay and English are taught as compulsory subjects. Tamil schools may range from single classroom where students of varying age and ability are taught by a single teacher, to large schools of a few hundreds students. In plantation estates the schools may be poorly staffed and equipped, and few of their students moved on to higher education. Those Indians who do well in schools are primarily from the urban middle classes.

Indians are well represented in Malaysian medical and legal fraternities. Indians also form a large portion of English language teachers in Malaysia. Law and medicine have traditionally been the preferred career choices in Indian families although more young Indian Malaysians are now venturing into other fields such as engineering, finance and entrepreneurship. Ananda Krishnan and Tony Fernandes are examples of notable Malaysian tycoons of Indian heritage. There are major Indian business districts in Kuala Lumpur (Brickfields, Jalan Ampang and Jalan Masjid India); (Lebuh Pasar) in George Town, Penang; Jalan Tengku Kelana in Klang, Selangor; and Ipoh, Perak.

Economy and employment
There are considerable differences socially and economically between different groups of Indians in Malaysia. They form a significant part of the professional classes in Malaysia; in a census taken in 1999, Malaysian Indians were 15.5% of Malaysia's professional workforce. These include doctors (28.4%), lawyers (26.8%), dentists (21%), veterinary surgeons (28.5%), engineers (6.4%), accountants (5.8%), surveyors (3.0%) and architects (1.5%). However, many Indians are also ranked amongst the most disadvantaged. In 1970, around 39% of Indians in Malaysia were ranked among the poorest of the country. Incidence of poverty (those in the lowest 40% of the national income distribution) in Malaysia was 27.3% Indians. Official figures suggest that the percentage of Indians living below the official poverty line has decreased from 39.2% in 1970 to 1.9% in 2002, but the figures have been criticised as inaccurate. It has been claimed around 40% of Indians are at the bottom rung of the income ladder in 2015.

Many of the early South Indian immigrants such as the Tamils and Telugus worked in the agriculture sector, in particular as workers in plantations. In 1930, 60% of all Indians were in this sector, and by 1970, 45% of Indians were still involved in agriculture in Malaysia. Sri Lanka Tamils mainly occupied the subordinate administrative and technical positions in estates, positions they still dominate to this day. Also in the estates are the Malayalis who hold assistant and managerial positions. Few of these estates however are Indian-owned. Indians are also prominent in the transport and communication sector, either as labourers or as administrative and technical staff.

Many Indians are also involved in business and trade, the majority of the privately owned businesses belong to the Chettiars. The Sikhs and other Punjabis were initially recruited by the British to serve in the police and armed forces, and while in modern times these areas are now dominated by Malays, the descendants of Sikhs and other Punjabi are now found in every sphere of the economy, in particular as professionals, and in the mercantile and money-lending business.

According to the Ninth Malaysia Plan report of 2006, Malaysian Indians also controlled only 1.2 percent of the corporate wealth in Malaysia, down from the previous figure of 1.5 percent.

Politics

The Malaysian Indian Congress (MIC) is the oldest and largest Indian political party in Malaysia. It is a senior member of the Barisan Nasional coalition. The Indian Progressive Front (IPF), another Indian-based party, is affiliated with Barisan Nasional but is not a formal member. The People's Progressive Party (PPP) is technically a multiracial party but its membership is overwhelmingly Indian. It is a member of the Barisan Nasional. The People's Justice Party (PKR) and Democratic Action Party (DAP) have a large Indian membership and have many Indian lawmakers. Both parties are members of the ruling Pakatan Harapan coalition. The Socialist Party of Malaysia (PSM), a minor opposition party, has a strong Indian presence. The Hindu Rights Action Force (Hindraf) was formed in 2007 to address alleged racial discrimination against Indian Malaysians. It was banned after it staged a large anti-government rally in Kuala Lumpur in 2007. Hindraf's political wing is the Human Rights Party (HRP). The Malaysian Indian Muslim Congress (KIMMA) is a party that represents the interests of the Indian Muslim community. There is the Punjabi Party of Malaysia (PPM) which represents Malaysia's Punjabi community. The Malaysian Ceylonese Congress (MCC) represents Malaysia's Sri Lankan Tamil community who are technically not Indian but often regarded as such by most Malaysians. Other Indian fringe parties include the pro-Barisan Nasional Malaysian Indian United Party (MIUP), Malaysia Makkal Sakti Party (MMSP) and the latest Malaysian Indian Justice Party (MIJP). There was also the Democratic Malaysian Indian Party (DMIP) which has been dissolved.

In the Malaysian general election held in 2018, sixteen Indians were elected to the Dewan Rakyat. This is the highest number of Malaysian Indians elected to parliament in Malaysian history.

HINDRAF is a current ally to the present Pakatan Harapan government. This is in addition to DAP and PKR which are multiracial parties with Indian representatives.

There are currently  1 minister and 1 deputy minister from the Malaysian Indian community in the Cabinet.

Media and the performing arts 

Satellite television provider Astro provides several Tamil satellite television channels. Astro Vaanavil and state-owned RTM TV2 broadcast locally produced Tamil shows. India-based channels available in Malaysia are Sun TV, Jaya TV, Chutti TV. Thanga Thirai and Velli Thirai are Tamil movie channels while Astro B4U is a Hindi movie channel. The Malaysian Indian community is an important market for the Tamil film industry Kollywood. There are 2-Tamil radio stations of the state-owned Minnal FM and the privately owned THR Raaga.

It is also customary for major Malaysian corporations to produce television commercials in conjunction with Deepavali. They generally pay tribute to the contributions of the Indian community to the nation and are well received by Indians of all faiths. The heart-warming Deepavali commercials by the state petroleum company Petronas are especially popular. Indian Malaysians have also contributed to the mainstream Malaysian entertainment industry. The Jayhawkers from Seremban led by one Joe Chelliah was the first non-Malay pop band with only Indian musicians that recorded popular commercial albums in Malay in the mid 1960s itself. More recent notable Indian Malaysian artists with multiracial appeal are Reshmonu, Jaclyn Victor, and Alleycats. Indian Malaysians have also made significant contributions to the Malaysian English theatre scene. Tamil hip hop was started in Malaysia by pioneers like rappers Chakra Sonic, Yogi B and several others, which had since then made its way to Kollywood.

Bharata Natyam, the Tamil classical dance of India, is an important feature of Tamil culture and is hence popular in Malaysia. Ramli Ibrahim and Mavin Khoo are two non-Indian Malaysians who are Indian classical dance performers. The Temple of Fine Arts in Brickfields, Kuala Lumpur is an academy that provides training in traditional Indian dance and music. The urumee drums are often played at religious and cultural events. The nadaswaram is a traditional Indian wind instrument often played at Indian weddings in Malaysia.

Cuisine

The contribution of the Indian community to Malaysian cuisine is enormous. Indian cuisine has had a strong influence on traditional Malay cuisine resulting in the popularity of curries in Malaysia. Indian restaurants are well received by Malaysians from all ethnic and religious backgrounds. They have become an important fixture in everyday Malaysian life and are the venue of choice for watching live televised football matches. Mamak restaurants and stalls refer to eateries owned and staffed by Indian Muslims. The word 'Mamak' is sometimes erroneously used to describe any Indian restaurant. Roti canai, nasi kandar, maggi goreng and pasembur (Mamak rojak) are Indian dishes unique to Malaysia. Nasi kandar is sold exclusively in Indian Muslim restaurants and the recipes are closely guarded secrets. Unlike Indian cuisine in the United Kingdom and other Western countries which tend to focus on North Indian cuisine, Indian cuisine in Malaysia is largely based on South Indian cuisine as the Malaysian Indian diaspora is overwhelmingly Tamil, although some northern dishes such as tandoori chicken and naan bread are common. Southern breakfast delicacies such as idli, vadai and dosa (spelled in Malaysia as 'thosai') are common. The appam is a favourite breakfast dish in Tamil homes. Idiyappam is known as putu mayam in Malay and usually sold by mobile motorcycle vendors. Murukku is made to mark Deepavali. Meals of rice with various vegetable and meat dishes along with other condiments are served on banana leaves in restaurants for lunch and dinner, and also in Indian households during special occasions. Mutton (goat meat) is highly favoured and served as either varuval (dry curry) or peratal (curry with a thick gravy). Fried bitter gourd, banana chips, papadam, rasam, yoghurt and pickles are the usual condiments. Desserts and sweets include payasam, halva, mysore pak, palgoa and ghee balls.
Some Indian foods have been widely adopted and localised. This includes but not limited to Murukku, Adhirasam and Puttu.

Religion

The Indian community which mostly consist of Tamils follow Hinduism as the main faith. Hinduism and Buddhism were brought to the Malay Peninsula from India around the 2nd century AD . The Indian-influenced kingdoms of Kadaram (Old Kedah), and Ilangosagam (Langkasuka) practised Hinduism and Buddhism during the rule of the Malay-Srivijaya and Tamil-Chola kingdoms. The early few Indians arrived and assimilated quickly into the local population through intermarriage.

The Chola King had also launched an attack via a naval expedition on several Malay Kingdoms. Subsequent to invasion, both Chola kingdom and south east Asian Hindu Buddhist kingdoms went into decline and many would later totally disappear, and kingdoms in Malaysia Indonesia were gradually Islamised. Hinduism is the most practiced religion amongst the Tamils, including both the major Hindu and Tamil pantheon of deities. Tamils of both Indian and Sri Lankan backgrounds practice Hinduism. The majority of the Malayalees and Telugus in Malaysia also practice Hinduism.

Sikhism is practiced mainly by Punjabis. Many Sindhis also worship in Sikh Gurdwaras in Malaysia. Christianity is practiced by a minority of Tamil people. In Malaysia, most of the Indian Christians are either Catholic, Pentecostal, Anglican, Methodist, or Lutheran. The majority of the Malayalee Christians are either Catholic or Syrian Christians. Trade contact with the Tamils predate the Islamic period (c. 570-632 AD), or the birth of Islam. Indonesians and Malays learned of Islam initially through Gujarati merchants and further developed on by the Arab traders. Most of the Indian Muslim community has been absorbed into the larger Malay community due to their common religious background, with a substantially high level of assimilation and intermarriage between the communities. In Malaysia, Tamil Muslims are often referred to as 'Mamaks' while Malayalee Muslims are known as 'Kakas' or 'Malabaris'.

Festivals

One of the biggest Hindu festivals in Malaysia is Thaipusam. Thaipusam is dedicated to the God Murugan which occurs on the day in the Tamil month of Thai (January–February) when the asterism Poosam is on the ascendant. It is celebrated in grand style in the temples of, George Town, Ipoh and Kuala Lumpur for three days.

In Kuala Lumpur, Thaipusam has become an almost national seat for Poosam celebrations. The venue of the Kuala Lumpur celebrations is a picturesque shrine right inside a cave that lies many feet above the ground, and can only be approached by a steep climb. This place, known as Batu Caves, is about eight miles from the city, and a chariot procession carrying the image of the deity to and from the place adds to the color and gaiety of the festival. Crowds from all over the country throng to the cave, including people of all classes and groups. It is above all a day of penance, on which many vows are fulfilled. A 42.7m high statue of Lord Murugan was built at Batu Caves and was unveiled in January 2006, having taken three years to construct.

One of the most significant rites performed is the carrying of the kavadi, a large wooden decorated arch, as an act of penance. When deities are taken on procession from one shrine to another, they would be followed by a number of these voluntary kavadi-bearers. In other towns and estates, kavadis would be carried for other festivals like Chittirai Paruvam. Some of the more rigid practitioners would bear spikes, spears, and hooks pierced into their bodies. The Chittirai Paruvam festival and festivals to the Tamil deity Mariamman are usually accompanied by a fire-walking ceremony.

Deepavali, popularly known as the 'Festival of Lights', is another major Hindu festival which is celebrated by all Hindu communities. Tamils celebrate Pongal which is a harvest festival usually held from 13–16 January. A similar festival known as Makar Sankranti is celebrated by most other Indian communities while the Punjabis call their harvest festival Lohri.

The Malayalees celebrate Vishu, the Malayalee New Year which usually falls in the month of April or the month of Medam in the Malayalam calendar. Onam is the most popular festival celebrated by the Malayalee community and is usually observed in the month of August or September. They usually prepare Sadhya, a lunch feast consisting 16 to 24 vegetarian dishes (without onions and garlics).

The Telugus celebrate Ugadi, the Telugu New Year which is based on the lunar calendar; unlike Puthandu, the Tamil New Year and Vasakhi, the Sikh New Year which are based on the solar calendar. Makar Sankranti is an important festival for Telugu community also celebrated as Pongal by Tamils.

The festivals celebrated by Malaysian Indians who profess the Christian faith are Easter, Christmas and All Souls' Day (mainly celebrated by Catholics). Indian Muslims observe Ramadan, the Muslim month of fasting; and celebrate Hari Raya Aidilfitri and Hari Raya Aidiladha.

Influence on Malaysian culture
Indian influences could be seen on modern Malaysia as well as on traditional Malay culture. The diffusion of Indian culture includes the following:

Malay folklore contains a rich number of Indian-influenced mythological characters, such as Bidadari, Jentayu, Garuda and Naga.
Early Malay literature was highly influenced by Indian epics, such as the Mahabharata and the Ramayana.
Wayang shadow puppets and classical dance-dramas of Malaysia took stories from episodes of Ramayana and Mahabharata.

Language and names

A good number of Tamil inscriptions as well as Hindu and Buddhist icons emanating from South India have been found in Southeast Asia (and even in parts of south China). On the Malay Peninsula, inscriptions have been found at Takuapa, not far from the Vishnuite statues of Khao Phra Narai in Southern Thailand. It is a short inscription indicating that an artificial lake named Avani-naranam was dug by nangur-Udaiyan which is the name of an individual who possessed a military fief at Nangur, being famous for his abilities as a warrior, and that the lake was placed under the protection of the members of the Manikkiramam (which according to K.A. Nilakanta Sastri, was a merchant guild) living in the military camp.

An inscription dated 779 AD has been found in Ligor, Malay Peninsula. This refers to the trade relationship between the Tamil country and Malaya. In ancient Kedah there is an inscription found by Dr. Quaritch Wales. It is an inscribed stone bar, rectangular in shape, bears the ye-dharmma formula in South Indian characters of the 4th century AD, thus proclaiming the Buddhist character of the shrine near the find-spot (site I) of which only the basement survives. The inscriptions are on three faces in Pallava Grantha script. The Ruler Raja Ganga fled from his empire into the forests with his queen and an infant heir. Raja Ganga left traces of hideout on a nearby hill in form of artefacts on stones. All these inscriptions, both Tamil and Sanskrit ones, relate to the activities of the people and rulers of the Tamil country of South India. The Tamil inscriptions are at least four centuries posterior to the Sanskrit inscriptions, from which the early Tamils themselves were patronizers of the Sanskrit language. The Cherok Tokun Ancient Inscriptions were first documented by Colonel James Low, a British army officer, in 1845. In his log, Low recorded his disappointment of not finding a more spectacular ruin, expecting to find an ancient temple ruin. He documented what he made out to be "a group of seven inscriptions". The inscriptions were believed to be in pre-Pallava script and written in Sanskrit. They were attributed to the ancient Kingdom of Kadaaram, which flourished in northern Malaysia in the 5th to 6th centuries. However, according to J Laidlay, who translated the text in 1848, the inscription was in fact written in Pali - another ancient language of the Indian subcontinent.

An element needed to carry out commercial transactions is a common language understood by all parties involved in early trade. Historians such as J.V. Sebastian, K.T. Thirunavukkarasu, and A.W. Hamilton record that Tamil was the common language of commerce in Malaysia and Indonesia during historical times. The maritime Tamil significance in Sumatran and Malay Peninsula trading continued for centuries and borrowings into Malay from Tamil increased between the 15th and 19th centuries due to their commercial activities. In the 17th century, the Dutch East India Company was obliged to use Tamil as part of its correspondence. In Malacca and other seaports up to the 19th century, Malay terminology pertaining to book-keeping and accountancy was still largely Tamil.

Infrastructure
Indians have contributed significantly to the building of Malaysia since the 19th century. The Indian workforce was instrumental in the clearing of land for infrastructure, established rubber plantations, built the roads, set up transmission lines as well as managed early Malayan railways, ports and airports. Indian doctors, chemists and veterinarians formed the bulk of medical personnel in Malaysia - their contributions still persist to present day. Indian civil servants formed the core of the civil service both pre- and post-independence. Indian teachers who were particularly fluent in the English language formed the backbone of Malaysian education, particularly in missionary schools. Indians also pioneered private education in Malaysia.

Diaspora
A number of Malaysian Indian immigrants are found in Australia, and they tended to be highly qualified and speak English fluently and were therefore highly employable. There is also a small community of Australians of Indian descent on the Australian external territory of Christmas Island who live alongside other Australians of ethnic Malaysian Chinese, Malay and European descent.

Notable people

Among the notable people of Indian descent in Malaysia are K. Thamboosamy Pillay, a prominent figure of early Kuala Lumpur, and Karpal Singh, V. David and Samy Vellu, all prominent Malaysian Indian politicians.

Challenges for the future

Despite the fact that the average income of Malaysian Indians exceeds that of their Malay counterparts, there exists substantial portion of the community who are poor, with 40% of Malaysian Indians claimed to be at the bottom rung of the income ladder. Despite the obvious need of the poor, Malaysian Indians are not eligible for any of Malaysia's affirmative-action programmes, which are reserved for Malays and select indigenous people. What has further added to the challenges faced by the community is religious conflict due to increasing Islamisation, and there were communal clashes between Indians and Malays such as the 2001 Kampung Medan riots, as well as protest over racial discrimination and temple demolitions during the 2007 HINDRAF rally. These factors in part have resulted in the migration of many highly skilled Malaysian Indians abroad, where Indian migrants are largely upwardly mobile. A survey in 2017 found that 42% of Malaysian Indians who had completed their secondary or tertiary education wanted to emigrate.

References

Notes

Bibliography 
 "Tragic Orphans: Indians in Malaysia" by Carl Vadivella Belle, Publisher: Institute of Southeast Asian Studies, 
 

 
Malaysia
 
Indian
Immigration to Malaysia
India–Malaysia relations